New Japan Pro-Wrestling had held a variety of professional wrestling tournaments competed for by wrestlers that are a part of their roster.

Sporadic tournaments
Pin-Pinfall; Sub-Submission; CO-Countout; DCO-Double countout; DQ-Disqualification; DDQ-Double Disqualification Ref-Referee's decision; NC-No Contest

1974 Karl Gotch Cup
The 1974 Karl Gotch Cup was a round-robin tournament held from October 25 until December 8. The tournament featured 8 participants. The tournament was held during the Toukon Series II tour. The winner of the tournament was Tatsumi Fujinami, who defeated Masashi Ozawa to win the tournament. Fujinami would later become a Japanese legend having success in both the junior heavyweight and heavyweight divisions. He would later become a six times IWGP Heavyweight Champion and also won the G1 Climax. Later he was abroad, to Mexico's Universal Wrestling Association and to Jim Crockett Promotions in the U.S.

Vacant IWGP Heavyweight Championship tournament

A tournament for the vacant IWGP Heavyweight Championship was held on April 24, 1989.

Kyushu Cup
The Kyushu Cup was a four-man tournament, which took place on June 12, 1990.

Japan/US All Star Tournament
The Japan/US All Star Tournament was an interpromotional single-elimination tournament pitting NJPW wrestlers against World Championship Wrestling wrestlers. The tournament took place during the 1996 G1 Climax.

G2 U-30 Climax Tournament 2003
The G2 U-30 Climax Tournament 2003 was a tournament.

Yuko Six Man Tag Team Tournament
The Yuko Six Man Tag Team Tournament was a tournament.

President Hoshino 10 Million Yen Offer Tag Tournament
The President Hoshino 10 Million Yen Offer Tag Tournament was a tournament.

Samurai! TV Openweight Tag Team Tournament
The Samurai! TV Openweight Tag Team Tournament was a tournament.

Yuke's Cup PREMIUM One Night Tag Tournament
The Yuke's Cup PREMIUM One Night Tag Tournament was a tournament.

J Sports Crown Openweight Six Man Tag Team Tournament 2010
The J Sports Crown Openweight Six Man Tag Team Tournament 2010 was a tournament.

J Sports Crown Openweight Six Man Tag Team Tournament 2011
The J Sports Crown Openweight Six Man Tag Team Tournament 2011 was a tournament.

IWGP Intercontinental Championship Tournament
On April 8, 2011, NJPW announced the participants in the tournament to crown the first IWGP Intercontinental Champion. The list of participants included former World Wrestling Entertainment performer MVP, who had signed a contract with NJPW in January 2011, Kazuchika Okada, who had been on a learning excursion to American promotion Total Nonstop Action Wrestling (TNA) since February 2010, Hideo Saito, who had been on a similar tour of Puerto Rican World Wrestling Council since September 2010, former IWGP Tag Team and IWGP Junior Heavyweight Tag Team Champions Tetsuya Naito and Yujiro Takahashi of No Limit, NJPW regulars Tama Tonga and Toru Yano and American independent worker Dan Maff, who made his first appearance for NJPW during the tour. On May 6 it was announced that Tonga had suffered an injury, which would force him out of the tournament. He would be replaced by former TNA and Ring of Honor performer Josh Daniels. On May 15, MVP defeated Yano in the final of the tournament to become the inaugural champion.

Tournament bracket

NEVER Openweight Championship Tournament
On October 5, 2012, over two years after the founding of NEVER, New Japan Pro-Wrestling announced the creation of the project's first championship, the NEVER Openweight Championship. The title was originally created with the idea of using it to "elevate younger wrestlers". The first champion was to be determined in a sixteen-man single-elimination tournament, which was set to take place November 15 and 19, 2012. The title and the tournament were announced by New Japan president Naoki Sugabayashi and NEVER regular Tetsuya Naito, who was scheduled to enter the tournament, but was forced to pull out after suffering a knee injury. Much like regular NEVER events, the tournament also featured wrestlers not signed to New Japan; freelancer Daisuke Sasaki, Hiro Tonai, Kengo Mashimo, Ryuichi Sekine, Shiori Asahi and Taishi Takizawa from Kaientai Dojo, and Masato Tanaka from Pro Wrestling Zero1. The entire first round of the tournament took place on November 15 and saw Shiori Asahi, Yoshi-Hashi, Taishi Takizawa, Ryusuke Taguchi, Tomohiro Ishii, Kengo Mashimo, Karl Anderson and Masato Tanaka advance. The rest of the tournament took place four days later. During the second round, Kengo Mashimo defeated Ryusuke Taguchi, Karl Anderson defeated Shiori Asahi, Masato Tanaka defeated Taishi Takizawa, Tomohiro Ishii defeated Yoshi-Hashi. The semifinals saw Anderson defeat Mashimo and Tanaka defeat Ishii. In the final of the tournament, Tanaka, the 39-year-old, who, despite officially being affiliated with Pro Wrestling Zero1, had worked for NJPW regularly since August 2009, defeated Anderson to become the inaugural NEVER Openweight Champion. Though the title was originally designed to be defended at NEVER events, NJPW has not held a single NEVER event since the championship tournament.

Vacant NEVER Openweight 6-Man Tag Team Championship
On August 1, 2020, NJPW announced a tournament to crown new NEVER Openweight 6-Man Tag Team Champions.

Inaugural KOPW Championship
NJPW announced a tournament to Crown the inaugural KOPW Champion.

Vacant IWGP Junior Heavyweight Tag Team Championship
On August 31, 2020, NJPW announced a league tournament to crown new IWGP Junior Heavyweight Tag Team Champions on the New Japan Road tour.

Lion's Break Crown
Lion's Break Crown was a tournament that took place between September 25, 2020 and October 9, 2020 on NJPW Strong.

Annually held tournaments

Footnotes

See also
Professional wrestling tournament

References

 
Professional wrestling-related lists